Oleh may refer to:

 Oleh, Delta
 Common Ukrainian male name, see also Oleg
 A Jew immigrating to Israel (plural of oleh is olim)

See also
 Oleg (disambiguation)